Indian Village Township is one of the twenty-one townships of Tama County, Iowa, United States.

History
Indian Village Township was organized in 1853. It was named from the Indians of Iowa present within its borders at the time of its organization.

References

Townships in Tama County, Iowa
Townships in Iowa